Amadalavalasa Assembly constituency is a constituency in Srikakulam district of Andhra Pradesh. It is one of the seven assembly segments of Srikakulam Lok Sabha constituency, along with Ichchapuram, Palasa, Tekkali, Pathapatnam, Srikakulam and Narasannapeta Assembly constituencies. In 2019, there are a total of 187,744 electors in the constituency. In 2019 state assembly elections, Thammineni Seetharam was elected as an MLA of the constituency, representing the YSR Congress Party.

Mandals 

The four mandals that form the assembly constituency are:

Members of Legislative Assembly Amadalavalasa

Election results

Assembly Elections 2004

Assembly elections 2009

Assembly elections 2014

Assembly elections 2019

See also 
 List of constituencies of Andhra Pradesh Legislative Assembly

References 

Assembly constituencies of Andhra Pradesh